The Xuande Emperor (16 March 1399  31 January 1435), personal name Zhu Zhanji (朱瞻基), was the fifth Emperor of the Ming dynasty, reigned from 1425 to 1435. His era name "Xuande" means "proclamation of virtue". Ruling over a relatively peaceful period within Ming history, he was also personally fond of painting and literature. The Emperor ordered tax reductions on burdened farmers and attempted to purge corruption from the revenue collectors. His attempts to reform meritocracy within the military was unsuccessful, and he was forced to recognize the independence of Vietnam when the Mongol threat diverted his attention.

Biography
Zhu Zhanji was the eldest son of the Hongxi Emperor and Empress Chengxiaozhao. He was described as a crown prince who was endowed with the quality of an excellent monarch in a section of his biography surrounded by superstition. His grandfather, the Yongle Emperor, had high hopes that he might play an important part to assist his father.

He was fond of poetry and literature. Although he continued to refer to Beijing as the secondary capital on all official documents, he maintained it as his residence and continued to rule there in the style of his grandfather, the Yongle Emperor. He permitted Zheng He to lead the seventh and last of his maritime expeditions.

The Xuande Emperor's uncle, Zhu Gaoxu, Prince of Han had been a favorite of the Yongle Emperor for his military successes, but he disobeyed imperial instructions and in 1417 had been exiled to the small fief of Le'an in Shandong. When Zhu Gaoxu revolted, the Xuande Emperor took 20,000 soldiers and attacked him at Le'an. Zhu Gaoxu surrendered soon afterward, was reduced to the status of a commoner. Six hundred rebelling officials were executed, and 2,200 were banished. The emperor did not wish to execute his uncle at the start, but later events angered the emperor so much that Zhu Gaoxu was executed through fire torture. All his sons were executed as well. It is very likely that Zhu Gaoxu's arrogance, well detailed in many historic texts, offended the emperor. A theory states that when the emperor went to visit his uncle, Zhu Gaoxu intentionally tripped him.

In 1428, the Xuande Emperor granted King Hashi of Chūzan the family name Shang (尚, Shō in Japanese), gave him the title of Liuqiu Wang (琉球王, Ryūkyū-Ō in Japanese, lit. 'King of Ryūkyū'), and gifted him a red lacquered tablet with Chung Shan (中山, Chūzan in Japanese) inscribed in gold, which was then placed on the Chūzonmon gate near Shuri Castle.

The Xuande Emperor wanted to withdraw his troops from Việt Nam, but some of his advisors disagreed. After Ming garrisons suffered heavy casualties, the emperor sent Liu Sheng with an army. These were badly defeated by the Vietnamese. The Ming forces withdrew and the Xuande Emperor eventually recognized the independence of Việt Nam. In the north, the Xuande Emperor was inspecting the border with 3,000 cavalry troops in 1428 and was able to retaliate against a raid by the Mongols of the Northern Yuan. The Ming government let Arughtai's Eastern Mongols battle with Toghon's Oirat tribes of the west. The Ming imperial court received horses annually from Arughtai, but he was defeated by the Oirats in 1431 and was killed in 1434 when Toghon took over eastern Mongolia. The Ming government then maintained friendly relations with the Oirats. China's diplomatic relations with Japan improved in 1432. Relations with Korea were generally good with the exception of the Koreans resenting having to send virgins occasionally to the Xuande Emperor's imperial harem.

A privy council of eunuchs strengthened centralized power by controlling the Jinyiwei (secret police), and their influence continued to grow. In 1428, the notorious censor Liu Guan was sentenced to penal servitude and was replaced by the incorruptible Gu Zuo (d. 1446), who dismissed 43 members of the Beijing and Nanjing censorates for incompetence. Some censors were demoted, imprisoned, and banished, but none were executed. Replacements were put on probation as the censorate investigated the entire Ming administration including the military. The same year the emperor reformed the rules governing military conscription and the treatment of deserters. Yet the hereditary military continued to be inefficient and to suffer from poor morale. Huge inequalities in tax burdens had caused many farmers in some areas to leave their farms in the past forty years. In 1430, the Xuande Emperor ordered tax reductions on all imperial lands and sent out "touring pacifiers" to coordinate provincial administration, exercising civilian control over the military. They attempted to eliminate the irregularities and the corruption of the revenue collectors. The emperor often ordered retrials that allowed thousands of innocent people to be released.

The Xuande Emperor died of illness in 1435 after ruling for ten years. He ruled over a remarkably peaceful period with no significant external or internal problems. Later historians have considered his reign to be the height of the Ming dynasty's golden age.

Despite his practical reforms to both civil and military administration, the Xuande emperor was also known for luxury and waste, as compared to previous reigns. He frequently sent eunuchs to the southern provinces to recruit entertainers and virgins for his harem, and his envoys made similar demands for women from Joseon. Civil officials criticized his indulgence and his entrusting of greater authority to eunuchs, such as regularising their position by establishing the palace school for eunuchs (which led to problems after his death).

The emperor as an artist

The Xuande Emperor was known as an accomplished painter, particularly skilled at painting animals. Some of his art work is preserved in the National Palace Museum, Taipei and formerly in the Arthur M. Sackler Museum (a division of Harvard Art Museum) in Cambridge, Massachusetts. Robert D. Mowry, the curator of Chinese art at the Arthur M. Sackler Museum, described him as "the only Ming emperor who displayed genuine artistic talent and interest."

The period of the Xuande Emperor (1426–1435) is often considered one of the most sophisticated periods in the history of Chinese Blue and White porcelain crafts.

Portrayal in art

Family

Consorts and Issue:
 Empress Gongrangzhang, of the Hu clan (20 May 1402 – 5 December 1443), personal name Shanxiang
 Princess Shunde (1420–1443), first daughter
 Married Shi Jing (9 January 1420 – 17 October 1479) in 1437
 Princess Yongqing (d. 1433), second daughter
 Empress Xiaogongzhang, of the Sun clan (1399–1462)
 Princess Changde (1424–1470), third daughter
 Married Xue Huan in 1440
 Zhu Qizhen, Emperor Yingzong (29 November 1427 – 23 February 1464), first son
 Consort Rongsixian, of the Wu clan (1397 – 16 January 1462)
 Zhu Qiyu, the Jingtai Emperor (21 September 1428 – 14 March 1457), second son
 Noble Consort Duanjing, of the He clan (d. 1435)
 Consort Chunjingxian, of the Zhao clan (d. 1435)
 Consort Zhenshunhui, of the Wu clan (d. 1435)
 Consort Zhuangjingshu, of the Jiao clan (d. 1435)
 Consort Zhuangshunjing, of the Cao clan (d. 1435)
 Consort Zhenhuishun, of the Xu clan (d. 1435)
 Consort Gongdingli, of the Yuan clan (d. 1435)
 Consort Zhenjinggong, of the Zhu clan (d. 1435)
 Consort Gongshunchong, of the Li clan (d. 1435)
 Consort Suxicheng, of the He clan (d. 1435)
 Consort Shu, of the Liu clan
 Concubine Zhen'aiguo, of the Guo clan (d. 1435), personal name Ai
 Lady Gongshen, of the Korean Cheongju Han clan (9 April 1410 – 18 May 1483), personal name Gye-ran

Ancestry

Popular culture
 Portrayed by Zhu Yawen in the 2019 Hunan TV series Ming Dynasty
 Portrayed by Xu Kai in the 2022 Hunan/Mango TV series Royal Feast "尚食".

See also
 Chinese emperors family tree (late)

References

Sources

Further reading

 
 "Chinese Government in Ming Times" by Charles Hucker (1969).

1399 births
1435 deaths
Ming dynasty emperors
15th-century Chinese monarchs
Ming dynasty painters
Animal artists
Painters from Beijing